Franciscus Xaverius Rocharjanta Prajasuta (November 3, 1931 – July 28, 2015) was an Indonesias Roman Catholic bishop and composer. He served as the Bishop of the Roman Catholic Diocese of Banjarmasin in South Kalimantan from 1983 to 2008.

Ordained to the priesthood in 1959, Prajusta was named bishop of the Roman Catholic Diocese of Banjarmasin, Indonesia, in 1983 and retired in 2008.

Notes

1931 births
2015 deaths
21st-century Roman Catholic bishops in Indonesia
Indonesian composers
People from South Kalimantan
20th-century Roman Catholic bishops in Indonesia